The Saurer 2 CM is a 4x4 truck model established by the Adolph Saurer AG in 1949 with a payload of 2.5 tons. There were 222 build most of them with a loading bridge, while some were made with a fixed structure as a van. The vehicles are right-hand driven. A winch was optional. The Saurer CM2 was also built by Berna and FBW (Franz Brozincevic Wetzikon) under their own names (FBW AX / Berna 2). The Saurer CM 2 formed the basis for other vehicles with more powerful engine and a larger payload capacity like Saurer 4CM 5t, Saurer 4CM driving school cars, Saurer Woodcarrier 4CM, 5CM 6t Saurer trucks and a mobile command center of the flab.
One is on display at the Schweizerisches Militärmuseum Full.

Bibliography 
 Kurt Sahli, Jo Wiedmer: Saurer. Nutzfahrzeuge damals und heute. Buri, Bern 1983, .
 Alber Wüst: Die Schweizerische Fliegerabwehr.  2011, 
 Fahrzeuge der Schweizer Armee by Markus Hofmann (2000)

References 
 Saurer 2 CM 3,5 t
 Saurer 4 CM 5t Fahrschulwagen
 Saurer 4 CM 5 t
 Saurer 4 CM Langholzwagen
 Saurer 5 CM 6 t 4x4 Kipper
 Berna 2 UM Funkwagen
 FBW AX 40 4x4 Einsatzzentrale ESA 83
 FBW AX 35 M. Gelastw. 3,5 t 4x4

Military trucks of Switzerland
Off-road vehicles
Military vehicles of Switzerland